Karl Beckersachs (1886–1951) was a German stage and film actor. He is sometimes credited as Carl Beckersachs.

Selected filmography
 His Majesty the Hypochondriac (1918)
 Midnight (1918)
 In the Castle by the Lake (1918)
 Hedda's Revenge (1919)
 The Gambler (1919)
 The Fateful Day (1921)
 Hannerl and Her Lovers (1921)
 The Five Frankfurters (1922)
 Maciste and Prisoner 51 (1923)
 The Secret Agent (1924)
 Girls You Don't Marry (1924)
 The Brigantine of New York (1924)
 What the Stones Tell (1925)
 A Waltz Dream (1925)
 Oh Those Glorious Old Student Days (1925)
 Ash Wednesday (1925)
 The Salesgirl from the Fashion Store (1925)
 People in Need (1925)
 The Old Ballroom (1925)
 Semi-Silk (1925)
 Department Store Princess (1926)
 The Beloved of His Highness (1928)

References

Bibliography
 Goble, Alan. The Complete Index to Literary Sources in Film. Walter de Gruyter, 1999.

External links

1886 births
1951 deaths
German male film actors
German male silent film actors
German male stage actors
People from Main-Taunus-Kreis
20th-century German male actors